Igor Yaroslavich was one of the younger sons of Yaroslav the Wise from the Rurikid dynasty of Kievan Rus’. He was baptized as George.

The date of his birth is unsure. Some historians consider him to be born in 1034–35, while others think that he was born after Yaroslav moved to Kiev in 1036. Upon the death of his father Iziaslav I of Kiev who was the eldest at that time appointed him as the Prince of Volyn. When another of his brother Vyacheslav has died under unknown circumstances, Igor was transferred to Smolensk. Around that time Rostislav of Tmutarakan was given his former realm to govern.

Like his other brother Vyacheslav, Igor died young when he was only 24, leaving behind two children Davyd and Vsevolod. Igor was married to a countess of Orlamünde; the wedding with whom was conducting while Yaroslav the Wise was still alive.

Children
 Davyd Igorevich, the Prince of Volyn (1086–1099). Davyd was constantly at war with the neighboring Vasylko from Terebovl.
 Vsevolod Igorevich

Ancestry

References

External links
Profile at spsl.nsc.ru 

1030s births
1060 deaths
11th-century princes in Kievan Rus'
Rurik dynasty
People from Novgorod Governorate